The 1968–69 season was Liverpool Football Club's 77th season in existence and their seventh consecutive season in the First Division. Liverpool came close to a record eighth league title, as they picked up the same number points that won them their seventh title in 1965-66. However, the team finished second to Don Revie's Leeds United. 

An early exit in the Fairs Cup, losing on coin toss to Athletic Bilbao in the opening round was the main disappointment, meaning that Bill Shankly was yet to lead the club to a European trophy.

In both the League Cup and FA Cup they would be knocked out by the eventual runners-up in both tournaments.

Squad

Goalkeepers
  Ray Clemence
  Tommy Lawrence

Defenders
  Gerry Byrne
  Chris Lawler
  John McLaughlin
  Ian Ross
  Tommy Smith
  Geoff Strong
  Peter Wall
  Ron Yeats

Midfielders
  Alf Arrowsmith
  Ian Callaghan
  Brian Hall
  Emlyn Hughes
  Doug Livermore
  Ian St. John
  Peter Thompson

Attackers
  Phil Boersma
  Alun Evans
  Bobby Graham
  Tony Hateley
  Roger Hunt

League table

Results

First Division

Football League Cup

FA Cup

Inter-Cities Fairs Cup

References
 LFC History.net – 1968–69 season
 Liverweb - 1968–69 Season

Liverpool F.C. seasons
Liverpool